Międzylesie  is a town in Kłodzko County, Lower Silesian Voivodeship, in south-western Poland. It is the seat of the administrative district (gmina) called Gmina Międzylesie, close to the Czech border.

As at 2019, the town has a population of 2,575.

See also
 History of Silesia

References

Cities and towns in Lower Silesian Voivodeship
Kłodzko County
Cities in Silesia